Denis Bouchard (born October 9, 1953) is a Canadian actor and playwright from Quebec. He is most noted for his performances in Denise Filiatrault's 1998 film It's Your Turn, Laura Cadieux (C't'à ton tour, Laura Cadieux), for which he received a Jutra Award nomination for Best Supporting Actor at the 1st Jutra Awards in 1998, and François Bouvier's 1999 film Winter Stories (Histoires d'hiver), for which he received a Genie Award nomination for Best Actor at the 20th Genie Awards in 2000.

Originally from L'Abord-à-Plouffe, a village which has since been amalgamated into the city of Laval, Bouchard has acted in film, television and stage roles since the late 1970s. His noted roles have included the television series Terre humaine, He Shoots, He Scores (Lance et compte), René Lévesque, Avec un grand A and Annie et ses hommes, the films Unfaithful Mornings (Les matins infidèles), An Imaginary Tale (Une histoire inventée), La Florida, The Ideal Man (L'homme idéal), The Barbarian Invasions (Les Invasions barbares), The Little Queen (La Petite reine) and The Fall of the American Empire (La chute de l'empire américain), and a 1980s stage revival of Gratien Gélinas's Fridolinades.

He was formerly married to actress Sandra Dumaresq, with whom he has one son. In a 2020 interview on Julie Snyder's television talk show La semaine des 4 Julie, he spoke for the first time about his relationship with his new wife, a funeral director whom he met while doing radio promotion for his death-themed theatrical play Le dernier sacrement.

References

External links

1953 births
Living people
20th-century Canadian male actors
21st-century Canadian male actors
21st-century Canadian male writers
21st-century Canadian dramatists and playwrights
Canadian dramatists and playwrights in French
Canadian male dramatists and playwrights
Canadian male film actors
Canadian male stage actors
Canadian male television actors
French Quebecers
People from Laval, Quebec
Male actors from Quebec
Writers from Quebec